Mayhew Beckwith (October 14, 1798 – April 7, 1871) was a merchant and political figure in Nova Scotia. He represented Cornwallis in the Nova Scotia House of Assembly from 1841 to 1851.

He was born in Cornwallis Township, the son of Handley Beckwith and Catherine Newcomb. He married Eunice Rand in 1829. Beckwith served on the board of governors for Acadia College

References 
 Eaton, AWH The History of King's County (1910) pp. 558–9

1798 births
1871 deaths
Nova Scotia pre-Confederation MLAs
Canadian Baptists
19th-century Baptists